Ipuka dispersum, is an aphid in the superfamily Aphidoidea in the order Hemiptera. It is a true bug and sucks sap from plants.

References 

 http://animaldiversity.org/accounts/Ipuka_dispersum/classification/
 http://bie.ala.org.au/species/Ipuka+dispersum
 http://bionames.org/names/cluster/2026871
 http://aphid.speciesfile.org/Common/basic/Taxa.aspx?TaxonNameID=1167940

Macrosiphini
Agricultural pest insects